Connaught plc was a company in the United Kingdom, operating in the social housing, public sector and compliance markets. A constituent of the FTSE 250 Index, it went into administration in October 2010.

History
The business was founded by William Tincknell (1935-2018) in 1982 as a concrete repair specialist and in 1986 won its first major social housing concrete repair contract.

Expansion
During the early 1990s Connaught expanded its services to include external wall insulation and overcladding and latterly began refurbishing all external elements of social housing including roofs, windows and doors. The business also expanded geographically. The 1990s saw significant corporate changes at Connaught plc, first in 1996 a management buyout funded by HSBC private equity and again in 1998 when the business was floated on the Alternative Investment Market. Mark Tincknell drove the business as CEO throughout this period. By 2004 the business had acquired social housing service providers in Scotland and Wales and had revenues in the region of £300 million and negligible net debt. In 2005 Mark Davies was appointed CEO. In 2006 Stephen Hill, formerly at Serco, was appointed finance director. Connaught was fully listed on the London Stock Exchange in 2006 and by 2007 the company had become a constituent of the FTSE 250 Index.

Having acquired Gasforce in 2002, Connaught appointed Altium Capital to advise on its regulatory obligations and acquisition strategy from 2003. Connaught acquired seven other related businesses between 2005 and 2007 and became the UK's leading provider of integrated compliance services with the 2007 acquisition of National Britannia. The acquisition of National Britannia cost the company £91 million, part funded by £57.9 million raised from investors. During 2009 Connaught acquired the listed environmental services company Fountains plc for £13 million.

Collapse
Connaught was shaken by a series of events triggered by the abrupt departure of its CEO Mark Davies in January 2010 following the sale of his shares valued at £5.5m. After Connaught issued a positive statement, shareholders were surprised when the business issued a profits warning on 26 June 2010: the company explained that the emergency budget introduced by the new government had damaged the company's profitability. Connaught subsequently warned of a 'material loss' for the year ended 31 August 2010. Mark Tincknell, who had taken over the running of the business again when Davies departed, then resigned as CEO on 8 July 2010 and Ian Carlisle took over the post.

Sir Roy Gardner was appointed chairman to Connaught's Board in May 2010, following the departure of chief executive Mark Davies.

On 8 September 2010, Connaught plc and Connaught Partnerships, the company's social housing arm, were put into administration.

In February 2011, Rentokil Initial acquired the Fumigation & Pest Control, Water Treatment & Hygiene and Fire Safety & Prevention businesses of Santia, formerly Connaught plc, for £5.6m.

Regulatory investigation
The preparation, approval and audit of the financial statements leading up to the administration of Connaught plc were investigated by the Accounting and Actuarial Disciplinary Board.

Operations
The Group was organised into three divisions:
 Connaught Partnerships
 Connaught Compliance  
 Connaught Environmental

References

Companies based in Exeter
Business services companies of the United Kingdom
Business services companies established in 1982
1982 establishments in England
Defunct construction and civil engineering companies
2010 disestablishments in England
Construction and civil engineering companies established in 1982
British companies established in 1982
British companies disestablished in 2010
Construction and civil engineering companies disestablished in 2010